Marvin Hall Jr. (born April 10, 1993) is an American football wide receiver who is a free agent. He played college football at Washington. He was signed by the Oakland Raiders as an undrafted free agent in 2016.

Professional career

Oakland Raiders
Hall was signed by the Oakland Raiders as an undrafted free agent on June 6, 2016, reuniting with former high school teammate Jaydon Mickens. On September 3, 2016, he was waived by the Raiders.

Arizona Cardinals
On December 14, 2016, Hall was signed to the Arizona Cardinals' practice squad. He signed a reserve/future contract with the Cardinals on January 3, 2017. On May 10, 2017, he was released by the Cardinals.

Atlanta Falcons
 
On June 2, 2017, Hall was signed by the Atlanta Falcons. He was waived on September 2, 2017, and was signed to the Falcons' practice squad. He was promoted to the active roster on October 14, 2017 and scored his first career touchdown, a 40-yard reception from Matt Ryan, the following day against the Miami Dolphins in a 20–17 loss.

Chicago Bears
On March 15, 2019, Hall signed with the Chicago Bears. He was waived on August 31, 2019.

Detroit Lions
On September 4, 2019, Hall was signed to the Detroit Lions practice squad. He was promoted to the active roster on September 21, 2019. He was placed on injured reserve on November 27, 2019, with a foot injury.

In Week 8 of the 2020 season, Hall had four receptions for 113 receiving yards in the 41–21 loss to the Indianapolis Colts. He was waived by the Lions on December 5, 2020.

Cleveland Browns
On December 7, 2020, Hall was claimed off waivers by the Cleveland Browns.

New England Patriots
On June 4, 2021, Hall signed with the New England Patriots. He was placed on injured reserve on August 15, 2021. He was released on August 25.

Atlanta Falcons (second stint)
On November 2, 2021, Hall was signed to the Atlanta Falcons practice squad. He was released on January 6, 2022.

Jacksonville Jaguars
On May 16, 2022, Hall signed with the Jacksonville Jaguars after attending rookie mini-camp as a tryout player. He was released on August 22.

References

External links
Detroit Lions bio
Washington Huskies bio

1993 births
Living people
Players of American football from Los Angeles
Susan Miller Dorsey High School alumni
American football wide receivers
Washington Huskies football players
Oakland Raiders players
Arizona Cardinals players
Atlanta Falcons players
Chicago Bears players
Detroit Lions players
New England Patriots players
Cleveland Browns players
Jacksonville Jaguars players